Greenisland railway station serves Greenisland in County Antrim, Northern Ireland. The station opened on 11 April 1848 as Carrickfergus Junction. It was renamed on 10 January 1893. The station used to be larger, with a third platform, but this was removed after the closure of the spur to the Derry~Londonderry Line. The station building is staffed from 7am to 3pm. A park and ride facility was built in 2009.

History 

It had long recognized that the need for Main Line trains to reverse like this at Greenisland was undesirable. Various plans for a direct line bypassing Greenisland had been proposed over the years, but the engineering problems faced by having to cross Valentine's Glen near Whiteabbey and surmount Mossley Col had precluded these.

This involved creating a new junction at Bleach Green where the Larne and Loop Lines diverged. The former mainline from Greenisland Junction was singled and joined the new Main Line at a new connection, Mossley Junction, to the east of Mossley station. The old mainline became known as the "Back Line". The ruling gradient on the Loop Line was 1 in 75 which could only be achieved by excavating and lowering a section of the existing Main Line near Mossley station. The new lines were carried over Valentine's Glen on imposing ferroconcrete viaducts. The smaller of these curved to the east from Bleach Green Junction as a burrowing junction passing under a skew span of the larger Main Line viaduct which curved westwards. The old masonry Main Line viaduct was retained to carry what had become the up Larne Line.

A strike by Irish locomotive men in 1933 delayed completion and it was not until 22 January 1934 that the new lines opened for regular service.

Part of the program included resignalling the lines between Belfast, Greenisland, and Mossley Junction with automatic color light signals. A new signal cabin was built at Greenisland to control train movements over the triangle formed by the Loop Line, Larne Line, and the Back Line.

Although the distance covered by the Loop Line was only two miles less than by the old route, eliminating the reversal at Greenisland saved as much as fifteen minutes allowing services to be accelerated. Some Main Line trains were divided at Ballyclare Junction, with coaches for Larne Harbour being detached and worked over the Back Line to Greenisland while the main part of the train continued to Belfast.

Service

On Saturdays, the service remains half-hourly, with fewer peak time services.

On Sundays, the service reduces to hourly operation in both directions.

References

Railway stations in County Antrim
Railway stations opened in 1848
Railway stations served by NI Railways
Railway stations in Northern Ireland opened in 1848